Back in Town is George Carlin's 15th album and ninth HBO special. It was also released on CD on September 17, 1996. This was also his first of many performances at the Beacon Theatre in New York City.

Track listing
"Abortion" - 8:41
"Sanctity of Life" - 3:50
"Capital Punishment" - 8:40
"State Prison Farms" - 8:13
"Farting in Public" - 3:00
"Familiar Expressions" - 9:14
"Free-Floating Hostility" - 19:30
a) Quote Marks in the Air
b) Badda-Boom, Badda-Bing
c) Bad Hair Day
d) I Heard That
e) My Needs Aren't Being Met
f) Mickey Mouse's Birthday
g) The Two Pandas in the Zoo
h) Sperm/Egg-Donors, etc.
i) Innocent Victims
j) Personal Bottles of Water
k) Women with Hyphenated Names
l) Telephone Calling Plans
m) Motivation Tapes/Books
n) One-Hour Photo Finishing
o) Too Many Vehicles
p) Backwards Baseball Hats
q) Earrings on Men
r) Colored Ribbons
s) Christian Athletes and Voices in One's Head
t) Aftershave and Cologne
u) Cowboy Hats and Cowboy Boots
v) Assholes with Camcorders
w) Whining Baby Boomers
x) In Defense of Politicians
y) Why I Don't Vote
z) Credits

In popular culture
During the ruling of Dobbs v. Jackson Women's Health Organization, a clip of Carlin's bit about abortion went viral on many platforms.

References

1996 live albums
1990s American television specials
George Carlin live albums
Stand-up comedy albums
Eardrum Records live albums
Atlantic Records live albums
HBO network specials
Stand-up comedy concert films
Warner Music Group live albums
1990s comedy albums